James Tilton (June 1, 1745 – May 14, 1822) was an American physician and soldier from Dover, Delaware. He was a delegate for Delaware in the Continental Congress of 1783 and 1784 and served as Surgeon General of the United States Army during the War of 1812.

Early life
James was born in 1745 to Thomas Tilton, a farmer in Kent County, Delaware. After attending the West Nottingham Academy in Cecil County, Maryland, he attended the College of Philadelphia, which later became the University of Pennsylvania. He graduated in 1768 and earned a degree as a Doctor of Medicine in 1771. He started a medical practice at Dover and served as an infantry Lieutenant in Dover's Company of the Kent County militia.

American Revolutionary War
When the Revolutionary War began, his militia became part of the 1st Delaware Regiment of the Continental Army. Colonel John Haslet quickly reassigned him to duty as the regimental surgeon. He served with distinction and saw action at the battles of Brooklyn, White Plains, Trenton, and Princeton. Haslet's unit was virtually destroyed in the Battle of Princeton in January 1777. Colonel Haslet was killed, and the command structure was rebuilt.

Tilton remained in service with the Continental Army as the head of military hospitals, first at Princeton and later at Trenton, New Jersey and other sites. When active fighting ended in 1781, he returned to his practice at Dover.

Later life

As the war was ending, the surviving Delaware officers organized a chapter in the Society of the Cincinnati. Tilton was elected as its first president at a meeting in Wilmington on July 4, 1783 and served in that office until 1793. During that time, he also moved to a home and farm just outside Wilmington.

Delaware named Tilton as a delegate to the Continental Congress three times from 1783 to 1785, but he did not attend sessions in the last year. He also served several terms in the state's House of Representatives.

The War of 1812 caused the US Army to reorganize support and administrative functions in 1813, which included the creation of a position for a Surgeon General of the Army. Tilton was the first to be appointed to that position and served from June 1813 until June 15, 1815.

Tilton died in 1822 at his home just outside Wilmington. He is buried in the Wilmington and Brandywine Cemetery. He was a longtime member of the American Philosophical Society, elected in 1773 and headed the Delaware Medical Society.

References

External links 

James Tilton biography at the U.S. Army Medical Corps
 Society of the Cincinnati
 American Revolution Institute

Places with more information
Delaware Historical Society website; 505 North Market Street, Wilmington, Delaware 19801; (302) 655-7161
University of Delaware Library website, 181 South College Avenue, Newark, Delaware 19717; (302) 831-2965

1745 births
1822 deaths
Burials at Wilmington and Brandywine Cemetery
People from Dover, Delaware
People of colonial Delaware
Perelman School of Medicine at the University of Pennsylvania alumni
Continental Army officers from Delaware
Continental Congressmen from Delaware
18th-century American politicians
Surgeons General of the United States Army
Members of the Delaware House of Representatives
Physicians in the American Revolution
18th-century American physicians
United States Army personnel of the War of 1812
Members of the American Philosophical Society